Artscape may refer to:

 Artscape (festival), an annual art festival in Baltimore, Maryland, US
 Artscape (organisation), a Swedish nonprofit arts organisation
 Artscape Nordland, an international art project in Norway
 Artscape Theatre Centre in Cape Town, South Africa
 Artscape, a 2011 Australian program broadcast by ABC Television